Megacarpaea is a genus of flowering plants belonging to the family Brassicaceae.

Its native range is Southern European Russia to Central Asia and Western and Central China. .

Species
Species:

Megacarpaea bifida 
Megacarpaea delavayi 
Megacarpaea gigantea 
Megacarpaea gracilis 
Megacarpaea iliensis 
Megacarpaea megalocarpa 
Megacarpaea orbiculata 
Megacarpaea polyandra 
Megacarpaea schugnanica

References

Brassicaceae
Brassicaceae genera